This Sporting Age is a 1932 American sports drama film directed by Andrew Bennison and A.F. Erickson and starring Jack Holt, Evalyn Knapp and Walter Byron.

Synopsis
A top polo player's daughter is in love with a worthy young man, but is compromised by a caddish club member. Her father challenges him to a match at the end of which the villain ends up dead.

Cast
 Jack Holt as Capt. John Steele
 Evalyn Knapp as Mickey Steele
 Hardie Albright as Johnny Raeburn
 Walter Byron as Charles Morrell
 J. Farrell MacDonald as 	Jerry O'Day
 Ruth Weston as Mrs. Rita Duncan
 Nora Lane as Mrs. Wainleigh
 Shirley Palmer as Ann Erskine
 Hal Price as 	Surgeon

References

Bibliography
 Dooley, Roger. From Scarface to Scarlett: American Films in the 1930s. Harcourt Brace Jovanovich, 1984.

External links
 

1932 films
1930s sports drama films
1930s English-language films
American sports drama films
Columbia Pictures films
American black-and-white films
Polo films
1930s American films